The 2021–22 season of Wrexham A.F.C. was the football club's 157th season. Despite being based in Wrexham in North Wales, the club plays in the English football league system, with 2021–22 being their 12th successive season in the National League; the season covers the period from 1 July 2021 to 30 June 2022. They also played in the English FA Cup and FA Trophy.

Following the takeover by Ryan Reynolds and Rob McElhenney at the previous season, they have arranged a FX docu-series called Welcome to Wrexham for the American Disney+ streaming service. A 20-person camera crew follow the players, coaches and fans to film the series for an entire matchday. The takeover from Wrexham Supporters Trust has resulted in investment of £2 million ($2.75m), attracting TikTok as kit sponsor and Expedia for the sponsor at the back of the kit.
The owners were in the crowd first time as the club played against Maidenhead United, while they made their first visit to the club's home ground in October 2021 with more than 9,800 supporters attending their introduction before kickoff against Torquay United.
Season-ticket sales for the season almost tripled to 5,800 from about 2,000.

On 24 January 2022, the club broke their biggest transfer record since 1978 to sign Ollie Palmer for £300,000.

As of March 2022, the club was negotiating the purchase of the freehold of the Racecourse Ground stadium from Wrexham Glyndŵr University.

First team squad

Competitions

Overall record

National League

League table

Matches
On Thursday, 7 July 2021, the National League fixtures were revealed.

Playoffs

FA Cup

The fourth qualifying round draw was made on 4 October 2021.

The first round draw was made on 17 October 2021.

FA Trophy

Transfers

Transfers in

Transfers out

References 

Wrexham A.F.C. seasons
Welsh football clubs 2021–22 season